Sborz is a surname. Notable people with this surname include:
 Jay Sborz (born 1985), American baseball player
 Josh Sborz (born 1993), American baseball player